Jacob J. Killa (July 5, 1879 – May 13, 1932) was an American politician and businessman.

Born in Milwaukee, Wisconsin, Killa went to Marquette University. He was the sales manager for the Standard Steel Company and a real estate broker. He served in the Wisconsin State Assembly in 1915 and 1919 and was a Democrat. Killa died in a hospital in Milwaukee, Wisconsin.

Notes

1879 births
1932 deaths
Politicians from Milwaukee
Marquette University alumni
Businesspeople from Wisconsin
Democratic Party members of the Wisconsin State Assembly